The 2020–21 FC Zbrojovka Brno season is the club's 25th season in the Czech First League. The team is competing in Czech First League and the Czech Cup.

First team squad
.

Out on loan
.

Transfers

In

Out

Friendly matches

Pre-season

Mid-season

Competitions

Overview

Czech First League

Results summary

Results by round

League table

Results

Czech Cup

Results

Squad statistics

Appearances and goals

|-
! colspan=16 style=background:#dcdcdc; text-align:center| Goalkeepers

|-
! colspan=16 style=background:#dcdcdc; text-align:center| Defenders

|-
! colspan=16 style=background:#dcdcdc; text-align:center| Midfielders

|-
! colspan=16 style=background:#dcdcdc; text-align:center| Forwards

 

|-
! colspan=16 style=background:#dcdcdc; text-align:center| Players transferred/loaned out during the season

Notes

Goal Scorers
{| class="wikitable sortable" style="text-align:center;"
|-
! Place
! Pos.
! Name
! Fortuna liga
! Czech Cup
! style="width:85px" | Total
|-
|rowspan="1"|1 ||FW|| align="left" |  Antonín Růsek||7||0||7
|-
|rowspan="1"|2 ||FW|| align="left" |  Jan Hladík||6||0||6
|-
|rowspan="3"|3 ||FW|| align="left" |  Jakub Přichystal||4||0||4
|-
||DF|| align="left" |  Peter Štepanovský||4||0||4
|-
||DF|| align="left" |  Luděk Pernica||4||0||4
|-
|rowspan="2"|6 ||MF|| align="left" |  Adam Fousek||2||0||2
|-
||MF|| align="left" |  Jiří Texl||2||0||2
|-
|rowspan="5"|8 ||DF|| align="left" |  Jakub Šural||1||0||1
|-
||MF|| align="left" |  Ondřej Pachlopník||1||0||1
|-
||FW|| align="left" |  Daniel Fila||1||0||1
|-
||MF|| align="left" |  Ondřej Vaněk||1||0||1
|-
||MF|| align="left" |  Šimon Šumbera||0||1||1
|- class="sortbottom"
| colspan="3" | Own goals
| 0
| 0
| 0
|-
! colspan="3"|TOTAL
! |33||1||34
|-

Notes

Assists
{| class="wikitable sortable" style="text-align:center;"
|-
! Place
! Pos.
! Name
! Fortuna liga
! Czech Cup
! Total
|-
|rowspan="1"|1 ||MF|| align="left" |  Ondřej Pachlopník||4||0||4
|-
|rowspan="2"|2 ||FW|| align="left" |  Jan Hladík||3||0||3
|-
||DF|| align="left" |  Peter Štepanovský||3||0||3
|-
|rowspan="4"|4 ||DF|| align="left" |  Pavel Dreksa||2||0||2
|-
||FW|| align="left" |  Antonín Růsek||2||0||2
|-
||MF|| align="left" |  Ondřej Vaněk||2||0||2
|-
||MF|| align="left" |  Jan Sedlák||1||1||2
|-
|rowspan="7"|8||DF|| align="left" |  Jakub Černín||1||0||1
|-
||FW|| align="left" |  Jakub Přichystal||1||0||1
|-
||DF|| align="left" |  Jan Hlavica||1||0||1
|-
||MF|| align="left" |  Adam Fousek||1||0||1
|-
||MF|| align="left" |  Šimon Šumbera||1||0||1
|-
||DF|| align="left" |  Jan Moravec||1||0||1
|-
||FW|| align="left" |  Daniel Fila||1||0||1

|- class="sortbottom"
|-
! colspan="3"|TOTAL
! |24||1||25
|-

Notes

Clean sheets
{| class="wikitable" style="font-size: 95%; text-align: center;"
|-
!width=60|Place
!width=60|Position
!width=60|Nation
!width=60|Number
!width=150|Name
!width=150|Fortuna liga
!width=150|Czech Cup
!width=80|Total
|-
|1||GK||||53 ||Martin Berkovec||4||0||4
|-
|2||GK||||59 ||Jiří Floder||2||1||3
|-
|3||GK||||40||Martin Šustr||1||0||1
|-
|colspan="4"|
|TOTALS
|7||1||8
|-

Notes

Disciplinary record
{| class="wikitable" style="font-size: 100%; text-align: center;"
|-
|rowspan="2" width="10%" align="center"|Number
|rowspan="2" width="10%" align="center"|Nation
|rowspan="2" width="10%" align="center"|Position
|rowspan="2" width="20%" align="center"|Name
|colspan="2" align="center"|Fortuna Liga
|colspan="2" align="center"|Czech Cup
|colspan="2" align="center"|Total
|-
!width=60 style="background: #FFEE99"|
!width=60 style="background: #FF8888"|
!width=60 style="background: #FFEE99"|
!width=60 style="background: #FF8888"|
!width=60 style="background: #FFEE99"|
!width=60 style="background: #FF8888"|
|-
|16 ||||MF||Jan Sedlák||8||0||1||0||9||0
|-
|24 ||||DF||Peter Štepanovský||6||1||1||0||7||1
|-
|4 ||||DF||Jan Hlavica||5||0||1||0||6||0
|-
|11 ||||MF||Adam Fousek||5||0||0||0||5||0
|-
|10 ||||MF||Antonín Růsek||4||1||0||0||4||1
|-
|66 ||||MF||Marek Vintr||3||0||1||0||4||0
|-
|21 ||||MF||Ondřej Pachlopník||4||0||0||0||4||0
|-
|24 ||||MF||Adrián Čermák||4||0||0||0||4||0
|-
|6 ||||DF||Pavel Dreksa||4||0||0||0||4||0
|-
|3 ||||DF||Jakub Šural||3||0||0||0||3||0
|-
|26 ||||DF||Timotej Záhumenský||3||0||0||0||3||0
|-
|14 ||||FW||Jakub Přichystal||2||0||0||0||2||0
|-
|27 ||||DF||Damián Bariš||2||0||0||0||2||0
|-
|8 ||||MF||Šimon Šumbera||2||0||0||0||2||0
|-
|90 ||||MF||Ondřej Vaněk||2||0||0||0||2||0
|-
|44 ||||DF||Luděk Pernica||2||0||0||0||2||0
|-
|17 ||||DF||Jan Moravec||2||0||0||0||2||0
|-
|20 ||||FW||Jan Hladík||2||0||0||0||2||0
|-
|3 ||||DF||Jakub Černín||1||0||0||0||1||0
|-
|15 ||||DF||Zoran Gajić||1||0||0||0||1||0
|-
|5 ||||MF||David Jambor||1||0||0||0||1||0
|-
|9 ||||MF||Daniel Fila||1||0||0||0||1||0
|-
|18 ||||MF||Jan Koudelka||0||0||1||0||1||0
|-
|colspan="14"|Players away on loan:
|-
|colspan="14"|Players who left Zbrojovka during the season:
|-
|colspan="3"|
|TOTALS
|67
|2
|5
|0
|72
|2
|-

Notes

References

External links
Official website

FC Zbrojovka Brno seasons
Zbrojovka Brno